Rising Star is a French singing reality competition television series, and the French edition of the international reality television franchise Rising Star. It is based on the Israeli singing reality competition series HaKokhav HaBa. The show's viewers become the instant ultimate juries with expert panelists given only a nominal percentage weight in voting. The French rights were bought by specialized music-oriented station M6.

Season 1 (2014)
Season 1 was launched in 2014 with first season being between 25 September and 13 November 2014. The live broadcasts were held on "Plateau No. 5" of the Cité du Cinéma established by the film director and producer Luc Besson and located in Saint-Denis, a northern suburb of Paris.

Hosts
The hosts for the series were Faustine Bollaert and Guillaume Pley. The series was won by Corentin Grevost.

Panelists
The four-member panelists were: 
Cali - singer songwriter 
Cathy Guetta - the event organizer (ex-wife of David Guetta)
David Hallyday - singer
Morgan Serrano - director of French NRJ radio station

Reception
Rising Star French edition realised relatively high viewership at launch with 3.76 million viewers, representing 16.9% of total French audience. But despite the novelty and immediate interactivity created for public voting, the show lost momentum with following episodes as audiences fell below the 2-million benchmark and with 6 November 2014 only 1.52 million viewers capturing just 6.7% of the market.

M6 announced that the French adaptation of Rising Star had failed to attain the figures M6 had anticipated, although its format was welcomed as "audacious" and "innovative". M6 followed that by its decision to cut short the planned series by two episodes, and airing the finals much earlier than anticipated, i.e. by 13 November 2014.

The auditions
The candidates (or groups) perform live with the series' band behind a big semi-circular screen name "The digital wall" such that they are invisible to the viewing public and the panelists. In real time and throughout the performance, the public votes by a "yes" or "no" through the special app launched with the goal of reaching the 70% set barrier where "the wall" is raised with the candidate moving to the next round called "duel". If he/she fails to reach the 70%, the candidate is eliminated. In this stage 28 candidates were selected to pass to the next round

Auditions 1 
The first show was broadcast on 25 September 2014 starting 20:55. 6 candidates qualified in day 1

 Index 
 ✔ : The panelist voted "yes" for the candidate.
 ✘ : The panelist voted "no" for the candidate.

Auditions 2 
The second episode was broadcast 2 October 2014 at 20:55. Seven candidates qualified for next round.

Auditions 3 
The third day of auditions was broadcast on October 9, 2014, at 20:55. Seven candidates qualified for the next round.

Auditions 4 
The fourth and final auditions round was broadcast on 16 October 2014 at 20:55. Nine candidates were chosen for next round. But one favourite candidate Gaël Lopez died almost immediately after the round and the number of qualified candidates reduced to 8.

Death of contestant Gaël Lopes
Gaël Lopes, a popular candidate from day 4 of the auditions broadcast on 16 October 2014 died on 18 October 2014, two days after the broadcast falling from the 4th floor of a building after a reported "delirium". Lopes had sung "Prayer in C" from Lilly Wood and The Prick, attaining 91% with the close of voting. He was just 25 and prior to Rising Star had also auditioned twice for Nouvelle Star in 2010 and 2012. A homage was broadcast in the next show on 23 October 2014 with participants singing "Prayer in C" again as a tribute.

Duels
In the second stage of competition, the 28 candidates through in the auditions are coupled into 14 pairs by a lottery to confront each other. The first candidate performs with "the wall" lifted throughout the performance. His aim is to attain the highest percentage possible. The confronting candidate has to perform "behind the wall". To pass through to the next stage, the second contestant has to outdo the first performance in percentage points in order to "raise the wall". The candidate with the lower percentage is eliminated even if he/she has attained the 70% barrier. Just like in the auditions, the vote of each panelist counts for 7% of the vote. During each contestant's performance, random pictures of people voting in his favour will appear on screen.

Duels 1 
The fifth episode of the series and the first of the two duels rounds was broadcast on 23 October 2014 at 20:55. At the end of the episode, all the candidates sang a tribute to parting contestant Gaël Lopes who had died a few days earlier, just 2 days after performing on the show.

Duels 2 
The sixth episode, and the second of two duels was broadcast on 30 October 2014 at 20:55.

Duels of champions

In the duel of the champions stage, two candidates are confronted one to one. The names are decided randomly by a lottery. The weight for the panelists is reduced in this stage to 5% each.

The seventh episode was broadcast on 6 November 2014 at 20:55.

Final 
The final was broadcast on 13 November 2014 at 20:50. The final was originally planned for 27 November 2014, but M6 citing lesser than expected viewership, decided to shorten the series by two weeks and do the finals much earlier. Corentin Grevost won the title of French Rising Star.

References

2010s French television series
2014 French television series debuts
Rising Star (franchise)